Peter Charles Percival Hambro (born 18 January 1945) is one of the founders of Petropavlovsk plc, (formerly Peter Hambro Mining), a  gold mining business in Russia.

Early life
Peter Hambro was born on 18 January 1945, the son of Lt-Col Everard Bingham Hambro, and grandson of Major-General Sir Percy Hambro. One of his paternal ancestors, Carl Joachim Hambro, was a Danish banker. Hambro was educated at Eton College and Aix-Marseille University.

Career
Hambro initially worked at a firm of accountants. He then briefly worked at Hambros Bank before moving on to Smith St Aubyn, a discount house, where he became a Managing Director in 1973. From 1983 to 1990 he worked at Mocatta & Goldsmid, a bullion house, where he became  Deputy Managing Director.

In 1994 with Pavel Maslovskiy, Hambro co-founded Peter Hambro Mining, which was renamed Petropavlovsk plc in 2009. He served as its chairman until June 2017. Petropavlovsk went into administration in July 2022.

Personal life
Hambro married Karen Brodrick in 1968. They have three sons.

References

1945 births
Living people
People educated at Eton College
Aix-Marseille University alumni
British people of Danish descent
British people of German-Jewish descent
Barons of Denmark
Danish nobility
Peter
Businesspeople from London
British mining businesspeople